Oakdale Cotton Mill Village is a historic textile mill, mill village, and national historic district located at Jamestown, Guilford County, North Carolina, United States. The district encompasses 37 contributing buildings including the Logan Manufacturing Company complex built during the 1880s and 33 frame mill worker houses dated to the early-20th century. The factory complex consists of a three-story rectangular brick office, a one and two-story L-shaped brick factory with a four-story tower and five one-story brick warehouses, a small one-story board-and-batten blacksmith shop, and a polygonal brick smokestack.

It was listed on the National Register of Historic Places in 1976.

References

Industrial buildings and structures on the National Register of Historic Places in North Carolina
Historic districts on the National Register of Historic Places in North Carolina
Buildings and structures in Guilford County, North Carolina
Blacksmith shops